K. V. Raju (1954 – 24 December 2021) was an Indian film director, screenwriter and dialogue writer who worked in Kannada cinema and Bollywood.

He started his career in Kannada film industry in 1982 as an associate director in Baadada Hoo directed by his brother K. V. Jayaram and debuted as a director and scriptwriter in 1984 film Olave Baduku. He directed many acclaimed Kannada films in the 1980s and 1990s. He debuted in Hindi film industry in 1991 as the director of Indrajeet and his other two Hindi films are  Udhaar Ki Zindagi and Khooni Jung. 

Raju died from a heart attack at his Rajaji Nagar residence in Bengaluru on 24 December 2021, at the age of 67.

Selected filmography

Director

 1987: Sangrama
 1987: Bandha Muktha
 1988: Navabharatha
 1989: Indrajith
 1989: Yuddha Kaanda
 1991: Sundarakanda
 1991: Kadana
 1991: Indrajeet (Hindi)
 1992: Belli Modagalu
 1992: Belli Kalungura
 1992: Police Lockup
 1993: Abhijith
 1993: Bombat Hudga
 1994: Udhaar Ki Zindagi (Hindi)
 1996: Huliya
 1997: Yuddha
 1998: O Gandasare Neeveshtu Olleyavaru
 2001: Prema Rajya
 2001: Rashtrageethe
 2004: Nija
 2006: Pandavaru

Writer only

References

External links
 K. V. Raju at the Book My Show
 

1954 births
2021 deaths
Kannada film directors
Kannada screenwriters